Mountains is the eighth studio album by American country music group Lonestar. It was the band's last album for BNA Records, it produced two singles on the Hot Country Songs charts: "Mountains" at No. 10 and "Nothing to Prove" at No. 51. After the single released, the band was dropped from BNA. This was also the last studio to feature Richie McDonald before leaving for a solo career, until he rejoined in 2011.

Stephen Thomas Erlewine of AllMusic gave the album two-and-a-half stars out of five, saying that "the group takes fewer risks than ever" on it.

Track listing

Personnel

Lonestar 
 Richie McDonald – lead vocals
 Dean Sams – keyboards, acoustic piano, backing vocals
 Michael Britt – acoustic guitar, electric guitars, backing vocals 
 Keech Rainwater – drums, percussion, backing vocals

Additional musicians 
 Jimmy Nichols – keyboards 
 Tom Bukovac – electric guitars
 B. James Lowry – acoustic guitar
 Bryan Sutton – acoustic guitar
 Mike Johnson – steel guitar
 Gary Morse – steel guitar
 Jimmie Lee Sloas – bass guitar
 Chris McHugh – drums
 Eric Darken – percussion 
 Kirk "Jelly Roll" Johnson – harmonica
 Jonathan Yudkin – strings, string arrangements
 Wes Hightower – backing vocals

Production 
 Mark Bright – producer 
 Derek Bason – engineer, mixing 
 J.R. Rodriguez – engineer 
 Chris Ashburn – assistant engineer, mix assistant 
 Nathan Dickinson – assistant engineer 
 Hank Williams – mastering at MasterMix (Nashville, Tennessee)
 Mike "Frog" Griffith – production coordinator 
 Judy Forde Blair – creative producer, liner notes 
 Astrid Herbold May – art direction, design 
 Margaret Malandruccolo – photography 
 Angela Cay Hall – grooming 
 Stephanie Sparkman – stylist 
 Trish Townsend – stylist

Charts

References

2006 albums
BNA Records albums
Lonestar albums
Albums produced by Mark Bright (record producer)